Lindita is an Albanian female given name, with the meaning "the day is born" - "lind dita".

Notable people bearing this name include:
 Lindita Arapi (born 1972), Albanian writer and journalist
 Lindita Halimi (born 1989), Albanian Kosovar singer and songwriter
 Lindita Kodra (born 1962), Albanian shooter

References  

Albanian feminine given names